Claire Rosinkranz (born January 2, 2004) is an American singer and songwriter from California. After releasing her music on social media, Rosinkranz was signed to Republic Records at the age of 16. She had her breakthrough in 2020 with her single "Backyard Boy" from her debut EP BeVerly Hills BoYfRiEnd.

History
Rosinkranz has been making music since she was eight years old. Rosinkranz used to help her father with ideas for songs he was writing for various TV shows and commercials. Rosinkranz came to wide recognition when her song "Backyard Boy" went viral on the video-sharing app TikTok. Rosinkranz's first EP was released in 2020, titled BeVerly Hills BoYfRiEnd. Rosinkranz released her second EP, 6 Of A Billion, in 2021.

Discography

Extended plays

Singles

As lead artist

Notes

References

Living people
21st-century American musicians
21st-century American women musicians
Musicians from California
2004 births